Frank–Toyo, also known as Isotonic–Cyndarella, was a Swiss professional cycling team that existed from 1987 to 1990.

The team competed in three editions of the Giro d'Italia, with rider Rolf Järmann winning a stage in 1989.

Major wins
1988
 Overall Grand Prix Guillaume Tell, Fabian Fuchs
1989
 Stage 4 Giro d'Italia, Rolf Järmann
 Overall Grand Prix Guillaume Tell, Karl Kälin
1990
 Overall Grand Prix Guillaume Tell, Werner Stutz
 Gran Premio di Lugano, Marco Vitali

References

Defunct cycling teams based in Switzerland
1987 establishments in Switzerland
1990 disestablishments in Switzerland
Cycling teams established in 1987
Cycling teams disestablished in 1990